German Clarinet Duo was a German jazz clarinet duo with Theo Jörgensmann, clarinet and Eckard Koltermann, bass clarinet. The duo formed in 1984 and existed  until 1998. The duo explores the synthesis of composition and improvisation.

Collaborations
German Clarinet Duo have collaborated with several other artists, including Karoly Binder, Maria de Alvear, Willem van Manen's Contraband or with Kenny Wheeler and Orkest de Volharding from Netherlands.

Discography
 Schwarzlicht released 1988
 Materialized Perception with Perry Robinson released 1992
 Hommage a Jimmy Giuffre released 1994 
 T. Jörgensmann/E. Koltermann Pagine Gialle, recorded 1995; released 2001 (Hathut Records)

References

External links
  German Clarinet Duo homepage 

German jazz ensembles
Chamber jazz ensembles